Afrotis is a genus of bustard in the family Otididae. The genus is endemic to southern Africa, and contains two species. It is sometimes included in the genus Eupodotis.

Species

References

 
 
Taxa named by George Robert Gray